The third season of Bad Girls Club premiered on December 2, 2008, on Oxygen. It is the first season to expand from a half-hour to one-hour format. Production of the season began in June 2008, and was located in Los Angeles, California. It is also the first season to feature the girls taking a vacation. At the time of its premiere, the third season was the network's highest-rated and most-watched season premiere ever. It acquired a 0.8 household rating, averaging 807,000 total viewers. Among viewers 18–49, it acquired 568,000 viewers; 405,000 viewers were women 18–49 and 337,000 were women 18–34. This would later be surpassed by future seasons.

Cast
The season began with seven original bad girls, of which one left voluntarily, one was removed by production, and one was kicked out by another cast member. One replacement bad girl was introduced in their absences later in the season.

Duration of Cast

Episodes

Notes

References

2008 American television seasons
2009 American television seasons
Bad Girls Club seasons
Television shows set in Los Angeles